Bruce Anslie Evans (born September 19, 1946) is an American film director, producer and screenwriter best known for his work on Stand by Me (1986), Jungle 2 Jungle (1997) and Mr. Brooks (2007).

Career
Evans's first writing credit was on the 1984 film Starman with his partner Raynold Gideon, with whom he first worked on 1979's A Man, a Woman, and a Bank starring Donald Sutherland. Their second film, 1986's Stand by Me, which Evans also produced, was nominated for an Independent Spirit Award for Best Feature; his and Gideon's screenplay in particular was nominated for the Academy Award for Best Writing (Screenplay Based on Material from Another Medium), the Independent Spirit Award for Best Screenplay and the Writers Guild of America Award for Best Screenplay Based on Material from Another Medium. Evans and Gideon went on to write and produce the 1987 film Made in Heaven before writing Kuffs (1992), which Evans directed and Gideon produced. The film, featuring Christian Slater, won the Special Jury Prize at the 1992 Festival du Film Policier de Cognac. The pair were given story credit for the 1995 film Cutthroat Island after performing a rewrite of "a completely different version" of the script.

After writing 1997's Jungle 2 Jungle, a remake of the 1994 French film Un indien dans la ville, Evans and Gideon wrote "screenplays and rewrites and all of that kind of stuff" before their next credited film. They struggled to have their subsequent scripts produced as each demanded too high a budget for most studios, including what they regarded as a "great World War I love story", until they wrote the 2007 film Mr. Brooks, starring Kevin Costner as the title character. With the idea of a seemingly normal business man who leads a second life as a serial killer, they hoped to "make an adult film" and "change our image" as writers in the film industry. They originally conceived the project as a television series, which they pitched to a number of television producers and studios in Hollywood. Their original version was considered "too soft", and their revised story, which was deemed "too dark", was written instead as a film spec script. Fifteen years since Kuffs, Evans said that, with Mr. Brooks, directing again "was kind of like riding a bicycle".

In addition to Evans and Gideon's intention of making two sequels to Mr. Brooks, Evans said that "we have two originals in mind" and "there are a few [scripts] that are kind of on hold that I would direct that other people have written".

Filmography

Script and continuity department

Miscellaneous crew

References

External links

1946 births
Living people
American male screenwriters
Film producers from California
Writers from Long Beach, California
Film directors from California
Screenwriters from California